Dande Darpakhel is a village in North Waziristan in Pakistan. It is a suburb of Miranshah.

The village has been the target of a number of US drone strikes, one of which, in November 2013, killed the emir of Tehrik-i-Taliban Pakistan, Hakimullah Mehsud.

As of the 2017 Census of Pakistan, Dande Darpakhel has 0 inhabitants.

Notable people 
 Mohsin Dawar

References

Ghost towns in Pakistan
Populated places in North Waziristan